Myriotrema subanamaliense is a species of corticolous (bark-dwelling) lichen in the family Graphidaceae. Found in Thailand, it was formally described as a new species in 2002 by lichenologists Natsurang Homchantara and Brian J. Coppins. The type specimen was collected in Namtok Phlio National Park (Chanthaburi Province) on a trail beside Phlio fall.

Myriotrema subanamaliense has a shiny and smooth, greenish-grey thallus with a dense cortex and a white medulla. It has numerous individual round-pored apothecia, which are immersed in the medulla. The lichen contains constictic and stictic acids, which are secondary chemicals. The specific epithet refers to its resemblance to Myriotrema anamaliense, a lookalike with much larger ascospores.

References

subanamaliense
Lichen species
Lichens described in 2002
Lichens of Thailand
Taxa named by Brian John Coppins
Taxa named by Natsurang Homchantara